Chemical protective clothing (CPC) is clothing worn to shield those who work with chemicals from the effects of chemical hazards that can cause injuries on the job. It provides a last line of defense for chemical safety; it does not replace more proactive measures like engineering controls.

Clothing selection factors 
There are some considerations with chemical protective clothing. For instance, no clothing is "impervious," since all clothing will eventually seep in chemicals. CPC also prevents evaporation, causing skin temperature to increase and potentially increasing the permeability of skin. CPC that has not been tested for the specific operating condition it is used in may not provide adequate protection. The same material, even at the same thickness, may provide different levels of protection depending on the manufacturer, since different manufacturers use different processes and may add different additives. Finally, while the test data will provide information on individual chemicals based on "worst-case scenario" continuous contact testing, most industrial exposures are not continuous and are in fact mixtures of chemical, for which permeation rates are different.

When selecting Chemical Protective Clothing, there are several factors that must be taken into account prior to selecting the garments that are needed. A risk assessment is often conducted to assist with making sure that the right protective clothing is selected. When selecting the appropriate chemical protective clothing, it is recommended to determine:
 The chemicals being used and their hazards
 The state of those chemicals; for example, if they are vaporous, they could be more hazardous
 Whether contact is a result of occasional splashing or a result of more continuous contact
 Whether the worker can be exposed from handling contaminated CPC
Environmental Conditions (Weather, location)
Duration the worker will be wearing the protective clothing
 The room temperature where the chemical is being handled
 The parts of the body that the chemical could potentially contact
 Whether the CPC resists physical wear and tear commensurate with the type of work being done
 Whether the CPC interferes with the work, for instance by limiting dexterity
From there, it is recommended that candidate garments should be selected and subject to appropriate testing. Testing is also considered necessary to make sure the material is suitable to the specific condition it will be used in, as opposed to the generic, worst-case scenarios it ordinarily undergoes. Once a garment is selected, it should undergo a limited evaluation with worker training. Once the garment is regularly used it should be regularly evaluated.

Clothing ensemble 
Chemical Protective Clothing ensembles are not a one size fits all approach. The level of protection needed and the hazards that are associated with the chemical will play a major role in what pieces of the ensemble are needed to fully protect the worker. When purchasing Chemical Protective Clothing, careful consideration should be taken to make sure that all pieces of the ensemble are compatible with each other. Pieces of the ensemble may include:

 Protective Suit (Fully Encapsulating, Splash Suit)
 Respiratory Protection (Self Contained Breathing Apparatus, Respirator)
 Head Protection (Helmet)
 Hearing Protection (Ear Plugs)
 Eye Protection (Safety Goggles / Face Shield)
 Gloves (Inner and Outer)
 Boots

Levels of protection 
The EPA categorizes Chemical Protective Clothing into four levels, with Level A being the highest level of protection and Level D being the lowest level of protection. These levels are based on the amount of protection for the user’s skin and respiratory protection.

 Level A – The highest level of both respiratory and skin protection. Consists of a full encapsulating suit that is vapor tight with respiratory protection consisting of either Self Contained Breathing Apparatus (SCBA) or supplied air respirator. Used when protection from vapor and liquid is needed. Ensemble may also consist of internal radio communication, head protection, boots, and gloves.
 Level B – The highest level of respiratory protection with reduced skin protection. Consists of chemical resistant clothing that may or may not be fully encapsulating, paired with either a Self Contained Breathing Apparatus (SCBA) or supplied air respirator. Used when there is a reduced risk of vapor exposure but there are concerns with exposure to respiratory tract. Ensemble may also consist of radio communication, head protection, face shield, boots, and gloves.
 Level C – Reduced respiratory protection along with reduced skin protection. Consists of a liquid splash protection suit (coveralls) paired with an air purifying respirator. Used when there is reduced risk of skin exposure to chemicals but there are concerns with contaminants in the air. Ensemble may also consist of radio communication, head protection, face shield, boots, and gloves.
 Level D – The lowest level of protection required. Can be used where there is no chance of chemical being splashed onto the worker and there are no contaminants that would harm the respiratory tract. Ensemble consist of standard work coveralls, face shield or safety glasses, gloves, and boots.

NFPA standards 
Over the years, the roles and responsibilities of first responders has drastically changed. To protect the best interest of those first responders, standards have been developed to assist agencies with selecting the appropriate level of protection. These standards also ensure that the chemical protective clothing has been tested and certified to meet a minimum set of specifications. The standards not only cover the protective clothing suit, but also all other components such as respiratory protection, gloves, boots, and all other garments that complete the ensemble.

 NFPA 1991 standard covers the requirements for ensembles that offer the highest level of protection. These types of suits would be classified on the EPA scale as Level A suits. These types of suits are fully encapsulating and are air tight (vapor resistive).
 NFPA 1992 standard covers the requirements for ensembles that are liquid/splash protective. These types of suits would be classified on the EPA scale as Level B suits. These suits are resistive to liquids and are not rated for any type of vapor protection.
 NFPA 1994 standard is broken down into 4 classes. NFPA 1994 Class 1 and 2 are intended to protect the user in an environment that requires a self contained breathing apparatus and where vapors or liquids are expected to make contact with the users skin. These liquids or vapors may include those of chemical warfare, bloodborne pathogens, or industrial chemicals. NFPA 1994 Class 3 must also be rated to protect the user from the same potential exposures of Class 1 and 2, however these ensembles only require the use of air purifying respirator. NFPA 1994 Class 4 ensembles are rated to protect the user from bloodborne pathogens and biological agents and offer no protection against industrial chemicals or chemical warfare.  Class 4 ensembles are rated to be used with an air purifying respirators as well.
 NFPA 1999 standard covers the requirements for ensembles that are single use or multi-use for protection against bloodborne pathogens or potential exposures to infectious diseases. These ensembles are rated to be used with an air purifying respirator.

See also 
 Chemical safety
 Personal protective equipment

References 

Chemical safety
Occupational safety and health